was a famed poet, scholar and tutor under the emperors of Shirakawa, Horikawa, and Toba. Masafusa was most known by his title of "Acting Middle Counselor". In 1060 AD, Masafusa became mainly known for being the author of the famous work: Gōke Shidai. For the ceremonial and public functions in the eleventh century, this became one of the most valuable sources of historic information. During the year of 1111, Masafusa died at the age of 71.

One of his students in the art of war was Minamoto no Yoshiie.

Masafusa authored a number of texts, including:
 (early 12th century)
 (mid to late 11th century)

Gōdanshō (江談抄)
Rōei gōchū (朗詠江註; a commentary to Fujiwara no Kintō's Wakan rōeishū)
Honchō shinsenden (本朝神仙伝)

Ancestry 
Otondo was a son of Prince Abo, who was a son of Emperor Heizei.

References 

1041 births
1111 deaths
Japanese writers
Ōe clan
Place of birth unknown
Date of death unknown
Place of death unknown
Date of birth unknown
Hyakunin Isshu poets